Zhanna Ryabtseva (December 8, 1977, Verkhneye Dubrovo, Sverdlovsk Oblast) is a Russian political figure and deputy of the 8th State Duma. From 2001 to 2014, she worked at the Pnevmostroymashina, first as an engineer and then as a CEO. In 2014, she became the head of the regional branch of the All-Russia People's Front in Sverdlovsk Oblast. He is a member of the Public Chamber of the Sverdlovsk Oblast. Since September 2021, she has served as deputy of the 8th State Duma. 

She is one of the members of the State Duma the United States Treasury sanctioned on 24 March 2022 in response to the 2022 Russian invasion of Ukraine.

References

1977 births
Living people
United Russia politicians
21st-century Russian politicians
21st-century Russian women politicians
Eighth convocation members of the State Duma (Russian Federation)
People from Sverdlovsk Oblast
Russian individuals subject to the U.S. Department of the Treasury sanctions